Bartenevsky is a rural locality (a settlement) in Bolshezhirovsky Selsoviet Rural Settlement, Fatezhsky District, Kursk Oblast, Russia. Population:

Geography 
The settlement is located on the Malaya Kuritsa River (a right tributary of the Bolshaya Kuritsa River in the Seym River basin), 94 km from the Russia–Ukraine border, 29 km north-west of Kursk, 17 km south of the district center – the town Fatezh, 6 km from the selsoviet center – Bolshoye Zhirovo.

 Climate
Bartenevsky has a warm-summer humid continental climate (Dfb in the Köppen climate classification).

Transport 
Bartenevsky is located 6 km from the federal route  Crimea Highway as part of the European route E105, 27.5 km from the road of regional importance  (Kursk – Ponyri), 11 km from the road  (Fatezh – 38K-018), 2 km from the road of intermunicipal significance  (M2 "Crimea Highway" – Kromskaya), 27 km from the nearest railway halt Bukreyevka (railway line Oryol – Kursk).

The rural locality is situated 33 km from Kursk Vostochny Airport, 149 km from Belgorod International Airport and 229 km from Voronezh Peter the Great Airport.

References

Notes

Sources

Rural localities in Fatezhsky District
Fatezhsky Uyezd